Little Herring Pond is a , shallow natural pond in the Cedarville section of Plymouth, Massachusetts, USA. The pond is located north of Great Herring Pond, west of Hedges Pond, southwest of Black Jimmy Pond (Hyles Pond), northeast of Island Pond and Triangle Pond, and east of Long Duck Pond. The pond has an average depth of three feet and a maximum depth of only four feet. The outflow is a stream that feeds Great Herring Pond, which in turn feeds the Herring River. Access to the pond is via a dirt road off Carters Bridge Road.

External links
MassWildlife - Pond Maps

Ponds of Plymouth, Massachusetts
Ponds of Massachusetts